Asgharabad (also Romanized as Aşgharābād) is a city in Marbin-e Olya Rural District, in the Central District of Khomeyni Shahr County, Isfahan Province, Iran. At the 2006 census, its population was 5,682, in 1,546 families.

References 

Populated places in Khomeyni Shahr County